Bear Lake State Park is a state park of Utah, USA, along the shore of Bear Lake on the Idaho border.  It offers three recreation areas: Rendezvous Beach, Bear Lake Marina, and East Side, which comprises several more segments. The park also hosts many annual events, such as a Mountain Man Rendezvous and Bear Lake Raspberry Days.

Recreational activities include waterskiing, swimming, scuba diving, and sailing. Anglers enjoy year-round fishing for cutthroat trout, mackinaw trout, Bonneville cisco, and whitefish.

Recreation areas

Rendezvous Beach
Rendezvous Beach is named for the historic rendezvous of fur trappers and Native Americans held here during the summers of 1827 and 1828. A thousand or more Native Americans and mountain men, including Jedediah Smith, attended these gatherings. There were so many campfires at the south end of the lake at these trading sessions that one observer called the area "a lighted city."

Today Rendezvous Beach is a  recreation area with 220 campsites, along with restrooms, showers, and utility hookups. It is a popular area for large gatherings such as family reunions. A local business rents small boats and personal water craft.

Bear Lake Marina
The Bear Lake Marina area is located about 8 miles north of Rendezvous on the west side of the lake, about 2 miles south of the Idaho border.  The Bear Lake Marina area provides a sheltered harbor, an -wide concrete boat ramp, boat slips, 13 campsites, restrooms, and showers. There is also a visitor center, along with a business renting boats and selling fishing and boating supplies.

East Side
The East Side portions of the park consists of six primitive camping sites and two concrete boat ramps. Then 2 miles further begins the Cisco Beach area, which runs approximately three miles from South Eden campground at the south to Rainbow Cove on the north . And one mile further north, is the North Eden campground, at the Idaho border.

References

External links

 

Bear River (Great Salt Lake)
Protected areas established in 1962
Protected areas of Rich County, Utah
State parks of Utah
Provincial and state parks in the Rocky Mountains